Susku Ekim Kaya (born 9 November 1990) is a British-Turkish actress.

Early life and career 
Susku Ekim Kaya was born on 9 November 1990 in Istanbul, Turkey and later moved to London. She has studied psychology at London Metropolitan University and graduated in 2016 and meanwhile, she continued her education, she has performed in several theatre performances in many venues including the Arcola Theatre London. She also trained at the International School of Screen Acting in 3 Mills Studio and graduated in 2017 with a screening at BAFTA. She started his acting career with film Diren and has later done various roles in different films, music videos and commercials. She has performed at Arcola Theatre in the Mahmud and Yezida: Turkish Romeo and Juliet play. She also performed in a solo play “A Woman Alone” written by Dario Fo & France Rame in 2014. In 2020, she directed a short film "Will You Be My Quarantine?" and has won awards at several festivals including Istanbul Film Awards and Europe Film Festival. In 2021, Susku Ekim Kaya has been the face of satirical campaign called "The Staunch Test “Best" campaign" that took place in London, UK. It was designed by screenwriter Bridget Lawless, who best known as the writer of the famous British TV series The Bill also the founder of the “Staunch Book Prize”, an award for thriller novels without violence to women. In 2021, she performed in the adaptation of Max Frisch's novel Bluebeard at the Barons Court Theatre.

Filmography

Theatre

Awards

References 

1990 births
Living people
Alumni of London Metropolitan University
21st-century Turkish women artists
Turkish film actresses